Manulla Junction railway station is a transfer point for train passengers in County Mayo, Ireland.

Description

Passengers cannot enter or leave the station; it is only for passengers travelling to or from Foxford or Ballina, who transfer to or from Dublin–Westport trains.

A similar station is Smallbrook Junction, Isle of Wight, England, where Island Line trains only stop on days when the Isle of Wight Steam Railway is running, to allow passengers to change between lines.

History
The station opened on 1 May 1868.

The signal cabin at the eastern end was destroyed in the Irish Civil War and was replaced by one at the Westport end.

The station was closed to passengers joining or leaving the railway network in 1963; however, passengers could still disembark to the platforms for connections to and from the Ballina branch line.

In 1988, the signal cabin was replaced by a portacabin-style structure on the island platform.

Incidents
On 5 September 1910, a train overran signals and 15 people were injured. The night mail had run into the engine of the branch line train and it was found shunting procedures at Manulla needed to be changed.

References

External links
Irish Rail Manulla Junction Website

Railway stations in County Mayo
Railway stations opened in 1868
Railway stations accessible only by rail